Hank Bell (January 21, 1892 – February 4, 1950) was an American film actor. He appeared in more than 370 films between 1920 and 1950. He was born in Los Angeles, California, and died in Hollywood, California, from a heart attack. Bell was nicknamed "Handlebar" for his mustache, which sometimes measured 18 inches from tip to tip.

Selected filmography

References

External links

1892 births
1950 deaths
American male film actors
American male silent film actors
Male actors from California
20th-century American male actors
Male Western (genre) film actors